Bovey Tracey Association Football Club is a football club based in Bovey Tracey, Devon, England.

History
The club was established in 1950 as a merger of  Bovey St Johns and Bovey Town. They became members of the South Devon League and won the league's Herald Cup in 1960–61. After winning the league in 2007–08, the club were promoted to Division One East of the South West Peninsula League. In their first season in the division they were runners-up and were promoted to the Premier Division. The club finished bottom of the Premier Division in 2014–15 and were relegated to Division One East. Following league reorganisation at the end of the 2018–19 season, the club were elevated to the Premier Division East.

Ground
The club initially played at the Recreation Ground. In 1979 they bought land at Mill Marsh Park to build their current ground.

Honours
South Devon League
Champions 2007–08
Herald Cup winners 1960–61

Records
Best FA Vase performance: Third round, 2022-23 
Best FA Cup performance: Extra preliminary round, 2020–21

See also
Bovey Tracey A.F.C. players
Bovey Tracey A.F.C. managers

References

External links
Official website

 
Football clubs in England
Football clubs in Devon
Association football clubs established in 1950
1950 establishments in England
South Devon Football League
South West Peninsula League
Bovey Tracey